The Roman Catholic Diocese of Kharkiv-Zaporizhzhia is a diocese of the Latin Church of the Catholic Church in Ukraine. Pavlo Honcharuk is the current bishop of the diocese. The diocesan seat is the Cathedral of the Assumption of the Blessed Virgin Mary in Kharkiv, and the co-cathedral is the Co-Cathedral of the Merciful Father in Zaporizhzhia.

History
The diocese was created in 2002, when territory from the dioceses of the Diocese of Kamyanets-Podilskyi, and the Diocese of Kyiv-Zhytomyr was split off and merged. The result created two dioceses with Catholic of around 5 percent, and one diocese with only 0.4, which is one of the lowest for any diocese.

Geography
The diocese is a suffragan of the Archdiocese of Lviv of the Latins.

Ordinaries
Bishop Stanislaw Padewski, O.F.M.Cap. (4 May 2002 – 19 March 2009)
coadjutor bishop Marian Buczek (16 July 2007 – 19 March 2009)
Bishop Marian Buczek (19 March 2009 – 12 April 2014)
 auxiliary bishop Jan Sobilo (30 October 2010 – present), titular bishop of Bulna
Bishop Stanislav Shyrokoradiuk, O.F.M. (12 April 2014 – 2 February 2019)
 Apostolic Administrator Stanislav Shyrokoradiuk, O.F.M. (2 February 2019 – 6 January 2020)
Bishop Pavlo Honcharuk (since 6 January 2020)

See also
Roman Catholic Deanery of Sumy
Roman Catholicism in Ukraine

Notes

References
 GCatholic.org
 Catholic Hierarchy

External links
 
 

2002 establishments in Ukraine
Christian organizations established in 2002
Roman Catholic dioceses and prelatures established in the 21st century
Roman Catholic dioceses in Ukraine